Barang Tehsil is a subdivision located in Bajaur District, Khyber Pakhtunkhwa, Pakistan.

Geography

Adjacent administrative units
Utmankhel Subdivision (North-East)
Timergara Tehsil, Lower Dir District (North-East)
Swat Rani Zai Tehsil, Malakand District (South-East)
Pran Ghar Subdivision, Mohmand District (south)
Ambar Utman Khel Subdivision, Mohmand District (South-West)
Khar Bajaur Subdivision (North-West)

History

Barang Subdivision was a part of the former Federally Administered Tribal Areas until the region was merged with Khyber Pakhtunkhwa on May 31, 2018. It was a tehsil before the FATA Interim Governance Regulation, 2018 was signed by President Mamnoon Hussain. It was upgraded to a subdivision at the time FATA was merged with Khyber Pakhtunkhwa.

Demographics

Barang Subdivision has a population of 76,558 people and 10,511 households according to the 2017 census.

See also 
 List of tehsils of Khyber Pakhtunkhwa

References 

Tehsils of Khyber Pakhtunkhwa
Populated places in Bajaur District